Arthur Parker (1878 – after 1897) was an English professional footballer who played as a full-back.

References

1878 births
People from Cleethorpes
English footballers
Association football fullbacks
Grimsby Rovers F.C. players
Humber Rovers F.C. players
Grimsby Town F.C. players
English Football League players
Year of death missing